The 1932 South Carolina Gamecocks football team was an American football team that represented the University of South Carolina during the 1932 Southern Conference football season. In its fifth season under head coach Billy Laval, the team compiled a 5–4–2 record (1–2–1 in conference) and outscored opponents by a total of 93 to 68. Harry Freeman and Bill Gilmore were the team captains.

Schedule

References

South Carolina
South Carolina Gamecocks football seasons
South Carolina Gamecocks football